The Jerusalem Cinematheque is a cinematheque and film archive in Jerusalem.

History
The Jerusalem Cinematheque was founded in 1973 by Lia van Leer. It was originally located in Beit Agron in the center of Jerusalem. A new building overlooking the walls of the Old City, close to the Hinnom Valley, was opened in 1981 with the financial support of the Ostrovsky Family Foundation, the Jerusalem Foundation, the Van Leer Foundation, and private donors.

In addition to screening halls, the Cinematheque houses the Israel Film Archive, an archive of films from the 1920s to today, The Nathan Axelrod Newsreel Collection, the Joan Sourasky-Constantiner Holocaust Multimedia Research Center, the Department for Film and Media Education, and the Lew and  Edie Wasserman Film Library.

See also 
 List of film archives
 Tel Aviv Cinematheque
 Haifa Cinematheque
 Jerusalem Film Festival

References

External links 
Jerusalem Cinematheque & Israel Film Archive Official website

Film archives in Israel
Cinemas and movie theatres in Israel
Buildings and structures in Jerusalem
Tourist attractions in Jerusalem
1973 establishments in Israel